Harold Douglas Baines (born March 15, 1959) is an American former right fielder and designated hitter (DH) in Major League Baseball who played for five American League (AL) teams from 1980 to 2001, and is best known for his three stints with the Chicago White Sox. A Maryland native, he also played seven years with his hometown team, the Baltimore Orioles, over three separate periods.

One of the most durable, consistent and respected hitters of his era, Baines batted over .300 eight times and hit .324 in 31 career postseason games, topping the .350 mark in five separate series. Upon his retirement he ranked seventh in AL history in games played (2,830) and tenth in RBI (1,628). Noted as well for his power hitting in clutch situations, he was tied for seventh in AL history in grand slams (13), fourth in three-home-run games (3), and tied for seventh in major league history in walk-off home runs (10). He went on to serve as a coach with the White Sox from 2004 to 2015 before moving into a role of team ambassador and spring training instructor. Baines was elected to the Baseball Hall of Fame by the Today's Game Era Committee as part of the Class of 2019.

Early years
Baines was raised in St. Michaels, Maryland by his father, Linwood, a stonemason, with his three brothers and a sister. He described his father as his "idol, more than anybody else." His father was separated from his mother, Gloria. White Sox owner Bill Veeck began scouting Baines when he was just 12 years old while Veeck was living on the Eastern Shore of Maryland. 

He graduated in 1977 from St. Michaels High School on Maryland's Eastern Shore where, as a senior, he batted .532 and was named a high school All-American. The White Sox made Baines the first overall selection in the 1977 amateur draft. He received a signing bonus of $32,000 – a record low for a first overall pick. The owner of the White Sox at the time, Bill Veeck, had spotted Baines playing Little League ball years before at the age of 12.

Professional career

On April 10, 1980, Baines made his major league debut on Opening Day, starting in right field and going 0-for-4 in a 5–3 loss to the Baltimore Orioles. In 1982, he batted .271 with 25 home runs and 105 RBI in 161 games. In 1984, baseball writer Bill James called Baines his favorite opposing player to watch, saying, "He is gorgeous, absolutely complete. I've seen him drop down bunts that would melt in your mouth, come up the next time and execute a hit and run that comes straight off the chalkboard. I've seen him hit fastballs out of the yard on a line, and I've seen him get under a high curve and loft it just over the fence." Baines ended the longest game in major league history (eight hours and six minutes over 25 innings on successive evenings) with a walk-off home run against the Milwaukee Brewers' Chuck Porter on May 8, 1984; the bat he used is currently kept at the Baseball Hall of Fame.

In 1986, a succession of knee problems began which gradually ended his fielding career, forcing him to become a regular designated hitter. Despite the knee ailments and the resulting lack of speed, he remained a powerful hitter, picking up 166 hits in 1988.

Baines holds the record for the most seasons by a player between 100-RBI seasons, with 14 seasons between 113 RBIs for Chicago in 1985 and 103 for Baltimore and Cleveland in 1999.

Midway through the 1989 season, the Texas Rangers acquired Baines, along with Fred Manrique, from the White Sox in a much-derided trade which sent Wilson Álvarez, Scott Fletcher and Sammy Sosa to Chicago. After the trade, the White Sox retired Baines's #3 on August 20, 1989, a rare occurrence for a player who was still active in the major leagues (the number would be "un-retired" each time Baines returned to the White Sox, and he wore it as a coach).

On August 29, 1990, Baines was traded to the Oakland Athletics for minor league pitchers Scott Chiamparino and Joe Bitker, and he helped them reach the postseason only to be swept by the Cincinnati Reds in the World Series. In 1992, the Athletics returned to the playoffs, but lost to the Toronto Blue Jays in the ALCS.

On January 14, 1993, Baines was traded by the A's to the Baltimore Orioles for minor league pitchers Bobby Chouinard and Allen Plaster. Baines batted .313, .294 and .299 over his first three seasons with Baltimore. On December 11, 1995, Baines returned to the White Sox as a free agent. On July 29, 1997, Baines was traded back to the Orioles for a player to be named later. He helped the Orioles reach the playoffs, where they lost to the Cleveland Indians in the League Championship Series.

Baines represented the Orioles in the 1999 All Star Game. On August 27, 1999, he was traded to the Cleveland Indians for minor league pitcher Juan Aracena and a player to be named later. On December 9, 1999, Baines returned for a third stint with the Orioles, signing a one-year, $2 million contract. He was traded back to the White Sox with catcher Charles Johnson in exchange for Miguel Felix, Juan Figueroa, Brook Fordyce and Jason Lakman on July 29, 2000.

His final contract with the White Sox was not renewed following the 2001 season, after his third stint with the team. He finished his career with 2,866 hits, 384 home runs and 1,628 RBI. His career RBI total is 34th all-time (through 2022); prior to his induction, he had the ninth-highest RBI count among retired players not elected in the Hall of Fame; his hit total ranks 46th all-time (through 2019).

Coaching career
Baines's fourth stint with the Chicago White Sox began when he was named bench coach in March 2004 under new manager Ozzie Guillén, his White Sox teammate, from 1985 to 1989 and in 1996–97. Baines served as the team’s interim manager for four games, from August 17–20, 2004, while Guillén was serving two consecutive two-game suspensions.

In 2005, as a coach for the White Sox, he earned a World Series ring when the White Sox won the 2005 World Series.

Honors
On July 20, 2008, the White Sox unveiled a bronze statue of Baines at U.S. Cellular Field prior to their game against the Kansas City Royals; it is the seventh statue featured on the park's outfield concourse.

In August 2009, the Orioles announced that Baines would be inducted into the Orioles Hall of Fame as the 46th member. In his seven seasons with the Orioles, he batted .301 with 107 home runs and 378 RBI as their designated hitter.

Hall of Fame candidacy

Baines had been eligible for the National Baseball Hall of Fame beginning with the 2007 election. While 75% of the vote is needed for induction, he never received greater than 6.1% (which he received in 2010). On January 5, 2011, Baines received just 28 votes (4.8%) in the 2011 Hall of Fame election, dropping him off all future writers' Hall of Fame ballots by receiving less than 5.0% of the vote.

On December 9, 2018, Baines and Lee Smith were elected to the National Baseball Hall of Fame Class of 2019 via the Today's Game Era ballot, a voting panel of 16 consisting of six players, one manager, six executives, and three journalists. Many baseball writers and fans expressed shock that a player who peaked at 6.1% of votes on the regular ballot and was eliminated after only five years was allowed in through the Today's Game Committee. Baines was voted into the Hall of Fame by his peers: he played against five of the six players on the committee, while a sixth served as manager against him. Four executives on the panel were in management while Baines was a player and his former manager and team owner also were on the committee. He and five other players were inducted into the Hall of Fame on July 21 before a crowd of 55,000, including 53 previous inductees.

Personal life

Baines's hometown of St. Michaels has designated January 9 as Harold Baines Day. He has also created the Harold Baines Scholarship Fund to help deserving college-bound students.

Baines is married to Marla Henry and has four children: Toni, Britni, Harold, Jr., and Courtney. All attended Baines's alma mater, St. Michaels Middle/High School.

In May 2021, Baines had to undergo emergency surgery for both heart replacement and kidney surgery, owing to inheriting the condition that his father had suffered from in amyloidosis, which he had found out a couple of years earlier. The surgeries were successful.

See also
List of Major League Baseball career home run leaders
List of Major League Baseball career hits leaders
List of Major League Baseball career doubles leaders
List of Major League Baseball career runs scored leaders
List of Major League Baseball career runs batted in leaders
List of Major League Baseball career total bases leaders

References

External links
Harold Baines at the Baseball Hall of Fame

Harold Baines at SABR (Baseball BioProject)
Harold Baines at Baseball Biography
Baseball Hall of Fame: Classy Baines Heralded for Clutch Hitting
White Sox Bio (Manager and Coaches): Harold Baines 
WhiteSox Community Relations Representatives: Harold Baines

1959 births
Living people
Major League Baseball right fielders
Major League Baseball designated hitters
Chicago White Sox players
Baltimore Orioles players
Oakland Athletics players
Texas Rangers players
Cleveland Indians players
National Baseball Hall of Fame inductees
American League All-Stars
Silver Slugger Award winners
Major League Baseball players with retired numbers
Baseball players from Maryland
African-American baseball players
Major League Baseball bench coaches
Major League Baseball first base coaches
Chicago White Sox coaches
African-American baseball coaches
Appleton Foxes players
Knoxville Sox players
Iowa Oaks players
Bowie Baysox players
Charlotte Knights players
21st-century African-American people
20th-century African-American sportspeople
People from Easton, Maryland